Kill or Cure is a 1923 American silent film featuring Stan Laurel. Prints of the film survive. It was directed by Scott Pembroke.

Plot
An unfortunate salesman tries to sell his Professor I.O. Dine's Knox-All medicine, which 'can be used for coughs, colds, toothache, furniture polish, after shaving, flea exterminator, baldness, grease spots, machine oiler, hair bleacher, etc.'.

Cast
 Stan Laurel as Door to door salesman
 Katherine Grant as Maid with bird cage
 Noah Young as Car owner
 Eddie Baker as Sheriff
 Mark Jones as Speedy Sam
 Helen Gilmore as Aggressive non-customer
 George Rowe as Deaf man
 Sammy Brooks as Short non-customer

References

External links

1923 films
1923 short films
1923 comedy films
American silent short films
Silent American comedy films
American black-and-white films
Films directed by Scott Pembroke
American comedy short films
1920s American films